Pourquoi Pas Glacier is a glacier 4 nautical miles (7 km) wide and 15 nautical miles (28 km) long, flowing north-northwest from the continental ice and terminating in a prominent tongue 9 nautical miles (17 km) west-northwest of Pourquoi Pas Point. Delineated by French cartographers from air photos taken by U.S. Navy Operation Highjump, 1946–47. Named in 1952 by the French Antarctic Sub-committee after the Pourquoi-Pas?, polar ship of the French Antarctic Expedition under Charcot, 1908–10, later used by Charcot in expeditions to Greenland.

Pourquoi Pas Glacier Tongue is a prominent glacier tongue 4 nautical miles (7 km) wide and 6 nautical miles (11 km) long, extending seaward from Pourquoi Pas Glacier. Delineated from air photos taken by U.S. Navy Operation Highjump, 1946–47, and named for the French polar ship Pourquoi-Pas?.

See also
 List of glaciers in the Antarctic
 Glaciology

References
 

Glaciers of Wilkes Land